The 1994 du Maurier Classic was contested from August 25–28 at Ottawa Hunt and Golf Club. It was the 22nd edition of the du Maurier Classic, and the 16th edition as a major championship on the LPGA Tour.

This event was won by Martha Nause.

Final leaderboard

External links
 Golf Observer source

Canadian Women's Open
Sports competitions in Ottawa
du Maurier Classic
du Maurier Classic
du Maurier Classic
du Maurier Classic
1990s in Ottawa